Barbara Worth ( born Verna Dooley; 1906–1955) was an American film actress and screenwriter.

Early years
Barbara Worth was born Verna Dooley in Columbus, Ohio, the daughter of James H. Dooley, a Chesapeake and Ohio Railway commercial agent. She attended both Ohio State and a private school in Charleston, South Carolina.

Career
Worth's entry into films came via a project of Universal Pictures Corporation. In 1925, she was one of 14 young women "comparatively unknown to the screen" who were selected for the Universal Stock Company, which trained them via "small parts and bits."

Her film career included 12 features.

Personal life
In 1926, Worth married Tamar Lane, who was editor and publisher of Film Mercury.

Filmography

Actress

 An Old Sweetheart of Mine (1923)
 Broken Hearts of Hollywood (1926)
 The Prairie King (1927)
 Fast and Furious (1927)
 On Your Toes (1927)
 The Fearless Rider (1928)
 Plunging Hoofs (1929)
 The Prince of Hearts (1929)
 The Bachelor's Club (1929)
 Fury of the Wild (1929)
 Below the Deadline (1929)
 Valley of Badmen (1931)
 Lightnin' Smith Returns (1931)
 Fighting Trooper (1934)
 Racing Luck (1935)
 Reckless (1935)
 Men of Action (1935)
 I Live My Life (1935)

Screenwriter
 Dragnet (1947)
 The Counterfeiters (1948)
 Zamba (1949)

References

Bibliography
Michael R. Pitts. Poverty Row Studios, 1929-1940: An Illustrated History of 55 Independent Film Companies, with a Filmography for Each. McFarland & Company, 2005.

External links

1906 births
1955 deaths
Screenwriters from Ohio
American film actresses
Actresses from Columbus, Ohio
20th-century American actresses
20th-century American screenwriters